Banksia chamaephyton, commonly known as the fishbone banksia, is a species of shrub that is endemic to Western Australia. It has prostrate, underground stems, pinnatipartite leaves, cream-coloured and brown flowers arranged in spikes surrounded by hairy bracts.  It grows in kwongan near the lower west coast.

Description
It has prostrate, underground stems  in diameter and hairy when young.

Taxonomy and naming
Banksia chamaephyton was first formally described in 1981 by Alex George from specimens he collected west of Mogumber in 1971. The specific epithet (chamaephyton) is derived from ancient Greek words meaning "low-growing" and "plant", referring to the prostrate habit of this species.

Distribution and habitat
Fishbone banksia grows in kwongan between Eneabba and Mogumber.

Conservation status
This banksia is classified as "Priority Four" by the Government of Western Australia Department of Parks and Wildlife, meaning that is rare or near threatened.

Use in horticulture
Seeds do not require any treatment, and take around 25 days to germinate.

References

chamaephyton
Eudicots of Western Australia
Plants described in 1981